

The High Council for Artisanal Lambic Beers (Dutch: Hoge Raad voor Ambachtelijke Lambiekbieren, HORAL) is a non-profit organisation that brings together the gueuze brewers and blenders of the Pajottenland and Zenne Valley in Belgium.

Goals

The stated goals of HORAL are:
 To promote  artisanal lambic beers and their derivates, with attention to the complete process from brewing process till serving.
 To report irregularities with regard to artisanal lambic beers and their derivates.
 To take the necessary steps  to protect  artisanal lambic beers and their derivates.

History
In January 1997, at the invitation of 3 Fonteinen's Armand Debelder, HORAL's founder members met in Beersel.  HORAL was formally established  with its original members: 3 Fonteinen, Boon, De Cam, De Troch, Lindemans, and Timmermans.

The first Toer de Geuze was organised on October 19 1997, when HORAL's member producers decided to open their doors to the public. Since then the open brewery day has become a biennial event.  Over the past two decades, the Toer de Geuze has effectively become the largest beer event of Flemish Brabant.
HORAL successfully campaigned for the creation of a European Union "traditional specialities guaranteed" (TSG) designation for the names "lambic" and "gueuze". This ensures that only products genuinely originating in the region are allowed to be identified as such in commerce. In 2016 HORAL met with representatives of Jester King Brewery to discuss a disagreement over the Americans' use of the term Méthode Gueuze. It was agreed that the Texan brewers would in future use the designation Méthode Traditionnelle as a style name.

HORAL's Megablend Oude Gueuze was first brought to the market in 2009. It is a blend of old and young lambics from HORAL's members. A gueuze enthusiast from Great Britain paid 300 EUR for the first bottle in 2015.

In 2018 lambic producers Girardin and 3 Fonteinen left HORAL. Werner Van Obberghen of 3 Fonteinen said: "We decided to leave HORAL because we could no longer agree with its current values.

In 2020 Lambiek Fabriek (Sint-Pieters-Leeuw) joined HORAL and in 2022 brewery Den Herberg (Buizingen).

Member producers 

 Boon
 De Cam
 Den Herberg
 De Troch
 Hanssens
 Lambiek Fabriek
 Lindemans
 Mort Subite
 Oud Beersel
 Tilquin
 Timmermans

Gallery of HORAL members in Flemish Brabant

References

External links
 The Brussels Times. Lambic craft beer honoured at the 12th "Geuze Toer."
 Méthode Traditionelle. On Méthode Gueuze, The Disagreement with HORAL, and A New Way Forward. 

Beer organizations
Alcohol in Belgium
Beer in Belgium